Ophonus oblongus is a species of ground beetle native to the Palearctic realm, including parts of Europe and the Near East. In Europe, it can only be found in Bulgaria and Greece.

References

Ophonus
Beetles of Europe
Beetles described in 1858
Taxa named by Hermann Rudolph Schaum